The minister of justice of Belgium is responsible for the Federal Public Service Justice.

List of ministers

1831–1899
1831          Alexandre Gendebien (liberal)
1831          Antoine Barthélémy (liberal)
1831–1832 Jean Raikem (Catholic)
1832–1834 Joseph Lebeau (liberal)
1834–1839 Antoine Ernst (liberal)
1839           Jean-Baptiste Nothomb (liberal)
1839–1840 Jean Raikem (Catholic)
1840–1841 Mathieu Leclercq (liberal)
1841–1842 Guillaume Van Volxem (liberal)
1842–1843 Jean-Baptiste Nothomb (liberal)
1843–1847 Jules Joseph d'Anethan (Catholic)
1847–1850 François-Philippe de Haussy (liberal)
1850–1852 Victor Tesch (liberal)
1852–1855 Charles Faider (liberal)
1855–1857 Alphonse Nothomb (Katholiek
1857–1865 Victor Tesch (liberal)
1865–1870 Jules Bara (liberal)
1870–1871 Prosper Cornesse (Katholieke Partij)
1871–1878 Théophile de Lantsheere (Katholieke Partij)
1878–1884 Jules Bara (liberal)
1884          Charles Woeste (Katholieke Partij)
1884–1887 Joseph Devolder (Katholieke Partij)
1887–1894 Jules Le Jeune (Katholieke Partij)
1894–1899 Victor Begerem (Katholieke Partij)

1900–1999
1899–1907 Jules Van den Heuvel (Katholieke Partij)
1907–1908 Jules Renkin (Katholieke Partij)
1908–1911 Léon de Lantsheere (Katholieke Partij)
1911–1918 Henri Carton de Wiart (Katholieke Partij)
1918–1921 Emile Vandervelde (BWP)
1921           Aloys Van de Vyvere (Katholieke Partij)
1921–1925 Fulgence Masson (liberal)
1925           Léon Théodor (Katholieke Partij)
1925           Paul Tschoffen (Katholieke Partij)
1925–1926 Prosper Poullet (Katholieke Partij)
1926–1927 Paul Hymans (liberal)
1927–1931 Paul-Emile Janson (liberal)
1931–1932 Fernand Cocq (liberal)
1932–1934 Paul-Emile Janson (liberal)
1934–1935 François Bovesse (liberal)
1935–1936 Eugène Soudan (POB)
1936–1937 François Bovesse (liberal)
1937           Hubert Pierlot (Katholieke Partij)
1937           Victor de Laveleye (liberal)
1937           Victor Maistriau  (liberal)
1937–1938 Charles du Bus de Warnaffe (Katholieke Partij)
1938–1939 Joseph Pholien (Katholieke Partij)
1939           Émile, Baron van Dievoet (Katholieke Partij)
1939           August de Schryver (Katholieke Partij)
1939           Eugène Soudan POB)
1939           Paul-Emile Janson (liberal)
1939–1940 Eugène Soudan POB)
1940           Paul-Emile Janson (liberal)
1940–1942 Albert de Vleeschauwer (Katholieke Partij)
1942–1944 Antoine Delfosse (Katholieke Partij)
1944–1945 Maurice Verbaet (Katholieke Partij)
1945           Charles du Bus de Warnaffe (Katholieke Partij)
1945–1946 Marcel Grégoire (UDB)
1946           Henri Rolin (PSB)
1946           Adolphe Van Glabbeke (liberal)
1946–1947 Albert Lilar (liberal)
1947–1948 Paul Struye (PSC)
1948–1949 Henri Moreau de Melen (PSC)
1949–1950 Albert Lilar (liberal)
1950           Henri Carton de Wiart (PSC)
1950–1952 Ludovic Moyersoen (CVP)
1952          Joseph Pholien  (PSC)
1952           Léonce Lagae (CVP)
1952–1954 Charles du Bus de Warnaffe (PSC)
1954–1958 Albert Lilar (liberal)
1958 Pierre Harmel (PSC)
1958–1960 Laurent Merchiers (liberal)
1960–1961 Albert Lilar (liberal)
1961–1965 Piet Vermeylen (BSP)
1965–1968 Pierre Wigny (PSC)
1968–1973 Alfons Vranckx (BSP)
1973–1977 Herman Vanderpoorten (PVV)
1977–1980 Renaat Van Elslande (CVP)
1980      Herman Vanderpoorten (PVV)
1980–1981 Philippe Moureaux (PSB)
1981–1988 Jean Gol (PRL)
1985–1988 Georges Mundeleer (PRL) (state secretary)
1988–1995 Melchior Wathelet (PSC)
1995–1998 Stefaan De Clerck (CVP)
1998–1999 Tony Van Parys (CVP)

2000–

Lists of government ministers of Belgium